is a former Japanese football player.

Club statistics

References

External links

1983 births
Living people
Momoyama Gakuin University alumni
Association football people from Fukuoka Prefecture
Japanese footballers
J2 League players
Japan Football League players
Tokyo Verdy players
Fagiano Okayama players
Giravanz Kitakyushu players
Association football defenders